John Wayne Bobbitt (born 1967) and Lorena Bobbitt (née Gallo; born 1969 or 1970) were an American couple married on June 18, 1989, whose relationship received international press coverage in 1993 when Lorena  severed John's penis with a food knife while he was asleep in bed; the penis was successfully surgically reattached. Lorena, an Ecuadorian immigrant and the primary breadwinner, claimed that her husband John, a bar bouncer and former U.S. Marine, had raped and abused her for years. John was charged with rape later that year but was acquitted and subsequently starred in two pornographic films. The next year, Lorena was acquitted of assault by reason of insanity and went on to start a foundation for domestic abuse victims and their children. The couple divorced in 1995.

Attack 
The incident in which Lorena Bobbitt severed her husband John Wayne Bobbitt's penis occurred on June 23, 1993, in Manassas, Virginia. Lorena stated in a court hearing that, after coming home that evening, her husband had raped her. After he then went to sleep, she got out of bed and went to the kitchen for a drink of water. She then grabbed an eight-inch Ginsu carving knife on the kitchen counter, returned to their bedroom, pulled back the bed sheets and cut off his penis.

After this, Lorena left the apartment with the severed appendage and drove away in her car. After a length of time driving and struggling to steer with one hand, she threw the penis out a window into a roadside field. She eventually stopped and called 9-1-1, telling them what had happened and where the penis could be found. John's penis was found after an exhaustive search, and after being washed with antiseptic and packed in saline ice, it was reattached in the hospital where he was treated. The operation took nine and a half hours. John went on to star in two pornographic films in the 1990s, and stated in 2018 that his penis is "back to normal". John also went on to accumulate a record of serious abuse allegations and some criminal convictions.

Arrest and trial 
When Lorena Bobbitt was arrested the night of June 23, she told the police, "He always have orgasm [sic], and he doesn't wait for me ever to have orgasm. He's selfish." This conversation with Detective Peter Weintz was tape-recorded, and the transcript was read later in the trial by Mary Grace O'Brien, the Prince William County Assistant Commonwealth's Attorney prosecuting Lorena.

During the trial, the Bobbitts revealed details of their volatile relationship and the events that led to the assault. Lorena stated that John sexually, physically, and emotionally abused her during their marriage, claiming that he had flaunted his infidelities and forced her to have an abortion. Her defense attorneys, who included the defense lawyer Blair D. Howard, maintained that John's constant abuse eventually caused Lorena to "snap" because she was suffering from clinical depression and a possible bout of post traumatic stress disorder (PTSD) due to the abuse. John denied the allegations of abuse; however, when he was cross-examined by Howard, his statements often conflicted with known facts, severely weakening the prosecution's case.

Lorena testified that John had raped her and physically battered her on multiple occasions prior to the evening of the incident, that they lacked financial stability, and that he stole her earnings and spent the proceeds. Both the prosecution and the defense conceded that John had demonstrated a history of abuse toward his wife and that this abuse created a context for the assault. Expert witnesses for both sides testified that "he had mentally and physically battered her; that the abuse was escalating; and that, by 1993, she lived in constant fear of him." The defense strategy emphasized Lorena's action as being a mix of self-defense and temporary insanity constituting an "irresistible impulse" due to the history and pattern of abuse and rape. One expert witness testified that, "Lorena believed and was immobilized by John's threat, 'I will find you, whether we're divorced or separated. And wherever I find you, I'll have sex with you whenever I want to.

John was later acquitted of marital sexual assault by a jury of nine women and three men. He gave multiple versions of what had happened that evening in question, relating at various times to police and to the court that "they had not had sex; that Lorena had tried to initiate sex, but he had been too tired; that they had had sex, but he had slept through it; and that the sex had been consensual."

After seven hours of deliberation, the jury found Lorena not guilty due to insanity causing an irresistible impulse to sexually wound John. As a result, she could not be held liable for her actions. Under state law, the judge ordered Lorena to undergo a 45-day evaluation period at Central State Hospital in Petersburg, after which she would be released. In 1995, after six years of marriage, John and Lorena finalized their divorce.

Aftermath

John 
After the incident, John attempted to generate money from his renown by forming a band, The Severed Parts, to pay his mounting medical and legal bills, although the band was unsuccessful and failed to generate enough money. In September 1994, he appeared in the adult film John Wayne Bobbitt Uncut in another attempt to make money. In 1996, he appeared in another adult film, Frankenpenis (also known as John Wayne Bobbitt's Frankenpenis).

In 1994, John was charged with striking Kristina Elliott, a 21-year-old former exotic dancer he met while in Las Vegas, Nevada, on a publicity tour. At the time, Elliot had been engaged to John, and the arrest caused her to break off the engagement. On August 31, 1994, he was convicted of battery and sentenced to fifteen days in jail (75% of the original 60-day sentence was suspended). "I firmly believe you have an attitude problem," Justice of the Peace William Jansen told John. "Your attitude problem is caused by your drinking."

On August 10, 1998, John appeared on the World Wrestling Federation (now WWE)'s Monday Night Raw is War television program, where he was featured with Val Venis. Not long after, he moved to Las Vegas and worked as a bartender, limo driver, mover, pizza delivery driver, and tow-truck operator. He also had a stint serving at a wedding chapel as a minister of a local Universal Life Church.

In 1999, John received probation for his role in a theft at a store in Nevada. In 2003, he was sentenced to prison for violating his probation for the 1999 theft, after he was arrested on battery charges involving his then-wife, Joanna Ferrell. He was again twice arrested on charges of battery against Ferrell in 2004, and that same year, he filed for divorce under the name John W. Ferrell, which he had been using during his marriage with Joanna. In 2014, John was severely injured when he broke his neck in a vehicular accident in Buffalo, New York.

Lorena 
After the trial, Lorena attempted to keep a low profile and reverted to the use of her birth name, Gallo. In October 1996, she made a visit to her native Ecuador, where she met with then-President Abdalá Bucaram for an official dinner. Some time later the two would baptize a child as a godmother and a godfather. Bucaram was criticized for inviting Lorena to the dinner.

In December 1997, Lorena made news when she was charged with assault for punching her mother, Elvia Gallo, as they watched television. She was eventually acquitted of assault, and her mother continued to live with her. In 2007, she was working at a beauty salon in Washington, D.C. and in the same year founded Lorena's Red Wagon organization, which helps prevent domestic violence through family-oriented activities.

In June 2008, Lorena appeared on the CBS News program The Early Show, where she talked about her life since the incident. In the interview, she said that she was in a long-term relationship with a man named Dave Bellinger and that they had a two-and-a-half-year-old daughter.

Joint public appearance 
Although Lorena told Oprah Winfrey in April 2009 that she had no interest in talking to John, they appeared together on the show The Insider in May 2009. It was their first meeting since their divorce. On the show, John apologized to her for the way he treated her during their marriage. John claimed that he still loved her and continued to send her Valentine's Day cards and flowers.

Legacy and depiction in popular culture 
The Bobbitt case brought attention to the issue of domestic violence and marital rape. Within days of the incident, some anti-domestic violence advocates and some feminist groups rallied around Lorena, citing the continuous abuse she suffered at the hands of John that led her to attack him, albeit in an unusual and violent manner.

Media attention surrounding the case resulted in national debate and also sparked a flurry of jokes, limericks, T-shirt slogans, advertising gimmicks, as well as Howard Stern having John as a guest on his 1993 New Year's Eve special and fundraising $250,000 to defray the outstanding costs of his surgery. MCI had also unknowingly been drawn into the fray by running a television commercial a couple of weeks after the incident, advertising how the Bobbitts—a family from Siaconset, Massachusetts, of no relation to John and Lorena Bobbitt—saved by switching to MCI, causing jokes to be made of "when they cut off your service, they mean it". "Weird Al" Yankovic's song "Headline News", a parody of the Crash Test Dummies hit "Mmm Mmm Mmm Mmm", mentions the incident.

Shortly after the incident, episodes of "Bobbittmania", or copycat crimes, were reported, although the incidents were generally self-inflicted wounds or accidents. The names of John and Lorena Bobbitt eventually became synonymous with penis removal. The terms "Bobbittized punishment" and "Bobbitt Procedure" gained social recognition.

The incident has been referenced in movies and television shows, such as the Coen brothers' 2004 remake of The Ladykillers and David Fincher's adaptation of Fight Club.

In February 2019, Amazon released Lorena, a four-part docu-series produced by Jordan Peele about the incident, which features interviews with both Lorena and John. 

On May 25, 2020, Lifetime aired I Was Lorena Bobbitt as part of its "Ripped from the Headlines" feature films. While Lorena serves as the onscreen narrator and executive producer, the film stars Dani Montalvo as Lorena Bobbitt and Luke Humphrey as John Bobbitt.

The bristle worm Eunice aphroditois is informally known as the "Bobbitt Worm" after the case, because it attacks its prey with scissor-like jaws.

In 2019, Family Guy referenced the incident in the episode "Peter and Lois' Wedding" where Peter and Lois meet in the '90s, in the beginning Peter states "it was the decade of Viagra but also the decade of Lorena Bobbitt, so it was a yay-boo period for penises". They were also referenced in the episode "The Lois Quagmire", first airing on February 27, 2022.

The Canadian hardcore punk band SNFU released a song "Bobbit" on their 1996 album Fyulaba.

A lyric from Lizzo's song "Grrrls" is "I'ma go Lorena Bobbitt on him so he never fuck again, no-oh, oh"

After the 1991 Gulf War, the United States Air Force decided to remove the tail gun turrets from all B-52 strategic bombers. Crews started calling the bombers without tail guns "Bobbited".

See also 
 Bertha Boronda
 Brigitte Harris case
 Catherine Kieu
 Lin and Xie case
 Penis transplantation
 Sada Abe
 Carlos Castro (journalist)

References

External links 

 
 

1990s in the United States
Criminal trials that ended in acquittal
Incidents of domestic violence
Intimate partner violence
Domestic violence in the United States
Living people
Violence against men in North America
Violence against women in the United States
Married couples
Year of birth missing (living people)